The 2019 Northwestern State Demons football team represented Northwestern State University as a member of the Southland Conference during the 2019 NCAA Division I FCS football season. Led by second-year head coach Brad Laird, the Demons compiled an overall record of 3–9 with a mark of 3–6 in conference play, tying for eighth place in the Southland. Northwestern State played home games at Harry Turpin Stadium in Natchitoches, Louisiana.

Previous season
They finished the season 5–6, 4–5 in Southland play to finish in a tie for eighth place.

Preseason

Preseason poll
The Southland Conference released their preseason poll on July 18, 2019. The Demons were picked to finish in tenth place.

Preseason All–Southland Teams
The Demons placed four players on the preseason all–Southland teams.

Offense

2nd team

Chris Zirkle – OL

Defense

1st team

Hayden Bourgeois – DB

2nd team

O'Shea Jackson – DL

Myles Ward – KR

Schedule

Game summaries

at UT Martin

Midwestern State

at LSU

at Houston Baptist

Southeastern Louisiana

at Nicholls

Central Arkansas

at Incarnate Word

at McNeese State

Lamar

at Sam Houston State

Stephen F. Austin

Roster

References

Northwestern State
Northwestern State Demons football seasons
Northwestern State Demons football